Polyrhaphis fabricii is a species of beetle in the family Cerambycidae. It was described by James Thomson in 1865. It is known from Ecuador, Brazil, Peru, French Guiana, Suriname, and Guyana.

References

Polyrhaphidini
Beetles described in 1865